Sybil (2006 – 27 July 2009) was a cat living at 11 and 10 Downing Street. Named after Sybil Fawlty from the television show Fawlty Towers, she was the pet of then Chancellor of the Exchequer, Alistair Darling.

When introduced in September 2007, Sybil, who was black and white, was the first cat at Downing Street since Humphrey was reportedly removed in November 1997, due to Cherie Blair's aversion to cats. In January 2009, Sybil returned to Edinburgh. On 27 July 2009, she died in Edinburgh, after a short illness.

See also
 List of individual cats

References 

|-

2006 animal births
2009 animal deaths
Individual cats in politics
Individual cats in the United Kingdom
Individual cats in England
Working cats
Chief Mousers to the Cabinet Office